Primagen and primogen are derived from "primogenitor", a word meaning the first or earliest ancestor. It may also be related to the word "primogeniture". The terms can refer to:

In business

 Primagen Holding BV, a biotech and pharmaceutical corporation in the Netherlands

In fiction

 Primagen, a primordial alien monster, the primary antagonist and final boss of Turok 2: Seeds of Evil
 Primogen, the chief, and usually most powerful and eldest, representative of a vampire clan within a domain in Vampire: The Masquerade and Vampire: The Requiem
 Primogen Daishirou and Primogen Laenzuo, monsters in EverQuest II
 Primagen, a fictional species created in the Furry Fandom
 ThePrimeagen, a streamer on Twitch